Kustaa Walter Kuusela (3 August 1903 – 31 July 1985) was a Finnish farmworker, farmer and politician, born in Honkilahti. He was a member of the Parliament of Finland from 1942 to 1948, representing the Social Democratic Party of Finland (SDP).

References

1903 births
1985 deaths
People from Eura
People from Turku and Pori Province (Grand Duchy of Finland)
Social Democratic Party of Finland politicians
Members of the Parliament of Finland (1939–45)
Members of the Parliament of Finland (1945–48)
Finnish people of World War II
Finnish farmers